The 2009–10 Belmont Bruins men's basketball team represented Belmont University during the 2009–10 NCAA Division I men's basketball season. The Bruins, led by 24th year head coach Rick Byrd, played their home games at the Curb Event Center, and were members of the Atlantic Sun Conference. They finished the season 19–12, 14–6 in the A-Sun, and being A-Sun regular season co-champions.

Roster

Schedule

|-
!colspan=9| Regular season

|-
!colspan=9| Atlantic Sun tournament

Sources

References

Belmont
Belmont Bruins men's basketball seasons